Edward Snell (22 April 1906 – 6 September 1973) was an English cricketer.  Snell was a right-handed batsman who bowled right-arm slow.  He was born at Hove, Sussex and educated at Winchester College.

Snell made three first-class appearances for Sussex, two in the 1927 County Championship against Worcestershire and Glamorgan, and one against Leicestershire in the 1928 County Championship.  In his three first-class matches, he scored just 13 runs at an average of 4.33, with a high score of 13.

He died at the town of his birth on 6 September 1973.

References

External links
Edward Snell at ESPNcricinfo
Edward Snell at CricketArchive

1906 births
1973 deaths
People from Hove
People educated at Winchester College
English cricketers
Sussex cricketers